Henicopidae is a family of stone centipedes in the order Lithobiomorpha. There are about 19 genera and at least 120 described species recognised in the family Henicopidae.

Genera

 Analamyctes
 Anopsobiella
 Anopsobius
 Buethobius
 Catanopsobius
 Cermatobius
 Dichelobius
 Easonobius
 Ghilaroviella
 Hedinobius
 Henicops
 Lamyctes
 Lamyctopristus
 Paralamyctes
 Pleotarsobius
 Rhodobius
 Shikokuobius
 Yobius
 Zygethobius

References

Further reading

 
 

Lithobiomorpha
Centipede families
Taxa named by R. I. Pocock